The Apostolic Vicariate of Awasa is a Roman Catholic Apostolic Vicariate in central Ethiopia.

It is exempt, i.e. directly dependent on the Holy See (notably the Roman missionary Congregation for the Evangelization of Peoples), not part of any ecclesiastical province.

Its cathedral episcopal see is the Kidane Mehret Cathedral located in the city of Awasa, on the shores of Lake Awasa in the Great Rift Valley.

The Vicariate of Awasa comprises the following:

Southern Nations and Nationalities Peoples Representatives State (SNNPRSRS):

 Sidama zone
 Gedeo zone
 Amaaro (special Wereda (District)
 Burji (special Wereda (District)

Oromia region:

 Guji zone
 Borana Zone

Somali region:

Liben Zone

History 
 Established on March 25, 1937 as the Apostolic Prefecture of Neghelli, on Ethiopian territories split off from the then Apostolic Vicariate of Galla and Apostolic Prefecture of Kaffa
 On 1940.02.13 it lost territory to establish the then Apostolic Prefecture of Hosanna
 Renamed after its see on October 15, 1969 as the Apostolic Prefecture of Awasa
 Promoted on March 15, 1979 as the Apostolic Vicariate of Awasa, hence entitled to a titular bishop.

Ordinaries 
(all Roman rite; so far missionary members of Latin congregations)

Apostolic Prefect of Neghelli  
 Fr. Gabriele Arosio, Pontifical Institute for Foreign Missions (P.I.M.E.) (May 21, 1937 – death 1945)
 Urbain-Marie Person, Capuchin Franciscans (O.F.M. Cap.) (January 2, 1952 – October 15, 1969 'see below); also Apostolic Administrator of Harar (below) (1952 – 1955.07.03), Apostolic Administrator of Apostolic Vicariate of Gimma (Ethiopia) (1952–1958), Apostolic Administrator of Apostolic Prefecture of Hosanna (Ethiopia) (1952.01.02 – 1972); Titular Bishop of Cyme (1955.07.03 – 1994.02.09) & Apostolic Vicar of Harar (Ethiopia) (1955.07.03 – 1981.12.04)

Apostolic Prefects of Awasa (Hawassa / Auasa) 
 Urbain-Marie Person, Capuchin Franciscans (O.F.M. Cap.) (see above October 15, 1969 – retired February 16, 1973)
 Fr. Armido Gasparini, Comboni Missionaries of the Heart of Jesus (M.C.C.I.) (February 16, 1973 – March 15, 1979 see below)Apostolics Vicar of Awasa 
 Armido Gasparini, M.C.C.I. (see above'' March 15, 1979 – December 20, 1993), Titular Bishop of Magnetum (1979.03.15 – death 2004.10.21)
 Lorenzo Ceresoli, M.C.C.I. (December 20, 1993 – retired March 21, 2009), Titular Bishop of Fallaba (1993.12.20 – ...)
 Giovanni Migliorati, M.C.C.I. (March 21, 2009 – May 12, 2016), Titular Bishop of Ambia (2009.03.21 – death 2016.05.12)
Roberto Bergamaschi, S.D.B. (2016.06.29 - ...)

References

External links
 GCatholic.org with incumbent bio links
 Catholic Hierarchy 

Catholic dioceses in Ethiopia
Christian organizations established in 1937
Apostolic vicariates
Roman Catholic dioceses and prelatures established in the 20th century
Sidama Region
Southern Nations, Nationalities, and Peoples' Region
1937 establishments in Ethiopia